Echinopsis cinnabarina is a species of cactus first described in 1885.

References

cinnabarina
Plants described in 1885